Platanthera obtusata, common name blunt-leaved orchid or small northern bog orchid, is a small species of orchid in the genus Platanthera. It widespread across much of the colder regions of the Northern Hemisphere, though rare in some parts of its range. Two subspecies are recognized:

 Platanthera obtusata subsp. obtusata - Alaska (including the Aleutians), much of Canada (all 13 provinces and territories), south along the Rocky Mountains to northern New Mexico; the Great Lakes States, the Adirondacks and northern New England; St. Pierre & Miquelon.
 Platanthera obtusata subsp. oligantha (Turcz.) Hultén - Norway, Sweden, Finland, Siberia and the Russian Far East

It is pollinated by several species of mosquito as well as by other insects.

References

External links 

 
 
 Plants of Wisconsin, Robert W. Freckmann Herbarium, Platanthera obtusata (Banks ex Pursh) Lindl.
 Ontario Wildflowers
 Dempster Country, Central Yukon Species Inventory Project (CYSIP), Platanthera obtusata Northern Bog Orchid

obtusata
Flora of Saint Pierre and Miquelon
Flora of Norway
Orchids of Europe
Orchids of Russia
Flora of Siberia
Orchids of Canada
Orchids of the United States
Plants described in 1813
Flora without expected TNC conservation status